Neotibicen linnei, commonly called Linne's cicada, is a species of large bodied annual cicada in the genus Neotibicen. It is native to the Eastern United States and Canada. N. linnei in Oklahoma is most easily identified by the coastal margin bent at the end of the radial cell and opercula truncated obliquely at the extremities.

References

Hemiptera of North America
Insects described in 1907
Cryptotympanini